St. Joseph's is a town in the Canadian province of Newfoundland and Labrador. It is located on the Avalon Peninsula, approximately 70 kilometres southwest of St. John's, and near St. Mary's Bay.

The town had a population of 86 in the Canada 2021 Census.

Demographics 

References

See also
 List of cities and towns in Newfoundland and Labrador

Towns in Newfoundland and Labrador